John E. Daubney  (1919–2003) was an Irish Catholic mayor of St. Paul, Minnesota, 1952-1954.

References

American people of Irish descent
Mayors of Saint Paul, Minnesota
Minnesota Republicans
1919 births
2003 deaths
20th-century American politicians